Erik Rafael Barragán (born 13 March 2000) is a Spanish professional footballer who plays as a forward for CD Mirandés B.

Club career
Born in Barcelona, Catalonia, Rafael represented CF Barceloneta, CF Damm, RCD Espanyol and Real Betis as a youth. On 20 August 2019, after finishing his formation, he was loaned to Tercera División side UA Horta for the season.

Rafael made his senior debut on 31 August 2019, starting in a 1–2 home loss against CF Pobla de Mafumet, and scored his first senior goal on 7 September by netting the opener in a 4–0 away routing of CF Igualada. The following 30 January, after scoring nine goals, he left the club and signed for RCD Mallorca's B-team.

On 6 September 2020, Rafael joined CE Manresa also in the fourth tier. On 26 July of the following year, he agreed to a contract with CD Mirandés and was assigned to the reserves in Tercera División RFEF.

Rafael made his first team debut for the Jabatos on 1 December 2021, coming on as a late substitute for Unai Rementería in a 3–0 away win over CD San Roque de Lepe, in the season's Copa del Rey. His professional debut occurred the following 2 January, as he replaced Imanol García de Albéniz late into a 2–0 home win over Real Zaragoza in the Segunda División championship.

References

External links

2000 births
Living people
Footballers from Barcelona
Spanish footballers
Association football forwards
Segunda División players
Tercera División players
Tercera Federación players
CF Damm players
Betis Deportivo Balompié footballers
UA Horta players
RCD Mallorca B players
CE Manresa players
CD Mirandés B players
CD Mirandés footballers